Multitude Media is a public relations firm based in London. The company was founded by Will Wood in June 2009.

Current clients include England and Manchester City footballer Micah Richards, Shatterbox Theatre Company (whose executive producer is Oscar-winning actress Emma Thompson), Manchester Comedy Festival, the world’s largest new media football company, Goal.com, the Brazilian Soccer Schools and Harry Potter actor, Matthew Lewis.

In November 2010, it was revealed that Multitude Media will handle the PR for Harry Potter actor, Matthew Lewis, who plays Neville Longbottom in the film series. They also work with television personalities including Rav Wilding, Tom Rosenthal and Joe Lycett. In April 2011, Multitude Media were appointed by the Human Trafficking Foundation.

References

External links

 Goal.com
 Manchester Comedy Festival
 Micah Richards Official Website
 Prweek.com
 Unicornjobs.com

Public relations companies of the United Kingdom